Harry Kerr may refer to :

Harry Kerr (sport shooter) (1856–1936), Canadian sports shooter
Harry D. Kerr (1880–1957), American songwriter, lyricist, author, and lawyer
Harry Kerr (racewalker) (1879–1951), racewalker from New Zealand
Harrison Kerr (1897–1978), American composer of classical music